The Good-Reilly House is a historic home located at Sharpsburg, Washington County, Maryland, United States. It is located at the northeast corner of the town square and is a -story stone house with combined Maryland colonial and Georgian stylistic influence. The house likely dates from the 1780s, and features flush stone chimneys on each gable end.

The Good-Reilly House was listed on the National Register of Historic Places in 2002.

References

External links
, including photo in 2002, at Maryland Historical Trust

Houses on the National Register of Historic Places in Maryland
Houses in Washington County, Maryland
Houses completed in 1780
Georgian architecture in Maryland
Sharpsburg, Maryland
National Register of Historic Places in Washington County, Maryland